No Nukes is a 1980 documentary and concert film that contained selections from the September 1979 Madison Square Garden concerts by the Musicians United for Safe Energy collective, with Jackson Browne, Graham Nash, Bonnie Raitt, and John Hall being the key organizers of the event and guiding forces behind the film.  Also included were scenes of the organizers getting the event together, expounding upon the dangers of nuclear power, and staging an anti-nuclear rally at Battery Park in New York City.

History
This was the first official appearance of Bruce Springsteen & The E Street Band's live act on film, and many critics hailed their performances as the best in the documentary.  Additionally, the future Springsteen classic "The River" was debuted at these shows and on the film, as well as Chaka Khan's consternation at being "Broooced" (Raitt deadpanned backstage, "Too bad his name wasn't Melvin").  The other generally acclaimed highlight of the film was Carly Simon and then-husband James Taylor's physically dynamic duet on "Mockingbird".  On the other hand, Graham Nash's earnest spoken part about having seen "giant sponges" as a side effect of nuclear waste dumps earned itself a Spinal Tap-like reputation for rock star verbal blundering.

No Nukes was released for home consumption on VHS, Betamax and LaserDisc along the way, but as of 2012 not on DVD.  Two of Springsteen's three numbers are available on his 2001 The Complete Video Anthology / 1978-2000 DVD, however.

The No Nukes live album was also released in May 1980 from this event, although it contained varying musical contents from the film (generally, the artists' biggest hits make it into the film but not the album, while some artists are on the album but not in the film).

Performers and songs
Those who performed in the film in order of appearance,

at Madison Square Garden:
 "Mockingbird" - James Taylor and Carly Simon
 "Runaway" - Bonnie Raitt
 "The Times They Are a-Changin'" - James Taylor, Carly Simon, Graham Nash, John Hall (portion)
 "Suite: Judy Blue Eyes" – Crosby, Stills & Nash (portions rehearsing in a quiet corner, then on-stage)
 "Running on Empty" – Jackson Browne
 "Before the Deluge" – Jackson Browne (portion)
 "Dependin' on You" - The Doobie Brothers
 "What a Fool Believes" - The Doobie Brothers
 "Barrel of Pain" – Graham Nash
 "Your Smiling Face" – James Taylor
 "Stand and Fight" – James Taylor (portion, more played over end credits)
 "We Almost Lost Detroit" - Gil Scott-Heron
 "Our House" – Graham Nash (portions with his family, then on-stage)
 "The River" – Bruce Springsteen & The E Street Band
 "Thunder Road" – Bruce Springsteen & The E Street Band
 "Quarter to Three" – Bruce Springsteen & The E Street Band
 "Takin' It to the Streets" - The Doobie Brothers with James Taylor, Carly Simon, John Hall, Graham Nash, others

at Battery Park:
 "No More Nukes" – Joy Ryder/Avis Davis Band
 "Power" – John Hall with Jackson Browne, Carly Simon, Graham Nash, Stephen Stills, Bonnie Raitt, others
 "Get Together" – Jesse Colin Young with the previous assortment

Other famous personalities and celebrities are seen during the film, including Jane Fonda, Chaka Khan, Maggie Kuhn of the Gray Panthers, Ray Parker Jr., Ralph Nader, Steven Tyler of Aerosmith, Nicolette Larson, Phoebe Snow, and ubiquitous backup singer Rosemary Butler.

External links

 Janet Maslin review in New York Times

1980 films
Concert films
1980s musical films
American documentary films
Anti-nuclear films
Three Mile Island accident
1980 documentary films
Warner Bros. films
1980s English-language films
1980s American films